The  is a city tram station on the Takaoka Kidō Line located in Takaoka, Toyama Prefecture, Japan. 

Railway stations in Toyama Prefecture